First Book is a national, nonprofit social enterprise focusing on educational equity as a path out of poverty. The organization addresses barriers to education faced by children in low-income and historically excluded communities by providing brand-new books and resources to children in need.

First Book has offices in Washington, D.C., and Toronto, Ontario, Canada.

History
First Book President and CEO Kyle Zimmer founded First Book with Peter Gold and Elizabeth Arky in 1992 to be a market-driven solution to the lack of books in the schools and programs serving children from under-resourced neighborhoods. First Book has grown to serve more than 500,000 educators working in Title I or Title I-eligible programs. Gold and Arky continue to serve on the First Book Board of Directors.

The First Book Marketplace 
The First Book Marketplace is First Book's eCommerce site that provides First Book’s network of educators, librarians, providers, and others serving children in need with thousands of free and affordable brand-new books, educational resources, and basic needs items. The First Book Marketplace is designed to address the barriers to education and attendance for kids in need from early childhood to age 18. It is available to educators and program leaders serving Title I or Title I-eligible schools and programs.

The First Book Network 
The First Book Network refers to the 500,000+ educators who access resources on the First Book Marketplace. Anyone serving Title I or Title I-eligible schools and programs is eligible to join the network, including out-of-school programs, faith-based organizations, shelters, clinics, libraries, museums, military family support programs, and early childhood programs.

References 

Non-profit organizations based in the United States
Organizations established in 1992
1992 establishments in Washington, D.C.